Laane is a village in Põhja-Sakala Parish, Viljandi County, Estonia. It has a population of 25 (as of 2002).

References

Villages in Viljandi County